The Windham Town Hall is a town hall in Willimantic, Windham, Connecticut.

History 
It was built in 1896 for the housing of the Windham County Courthouse and the Willimantic City Government. Before then, the government was held in a rented space in Hayden Block. It is made out of 1.25 million bricks, cost $73,000 (1895) to make, and contains a large clock donated by James Hayden. In 1915 President William Howard Taft visited the building. Warren Richard Briggs was the architect for the building, as he had made other courthouses similar to this in the state.  At one point the building house county courtrooms, The city of Willimantic government, the local Grand Army of the Republic group, and the Town of Windham government.

Recent history 
The police station, the county courthouse, and the city library relocated in 1977. It joined the Main Street Historic District, part of the National Register of Historic Places in 1982. The city hall became a town hall for Windham when Willimantic was downgraded to a CDP in 1983.

Gallery

Description 
The building is currently a large Romanesque Revival style building in general. It has a green clock tower on the top of the building, making the building 50 feet high. The building is 3 stories high, containing the offices of the town of Windham. It has a green area just outside of the building with a staircase leading from the street to the building.

See also 
 Willimantic Footbridge
 Jillson Mills
 Willimantic Freight House and Office

References 

Willimantic, Connecticut
City and town halls on the National Register of Historic Places in Connecticut
Town halls in Connecticut
Richardsonian Romanesque architecture in Connecticut
National Register of Historic Places in Windham County, Connecticut
Government buildings completed in 1896
Clock towers in Connecticut